Charles Stewart Middlemiss FRS (1859, Kingston upon Hull – 11 June 1945, Royal Tunbridge Wells) was a British geologist who worked in British India and the Princely States.

After education at Caistor Grammar School, Middlemiss matriculated in 1878 at St John's College, Cambridge and graduated there in 1881 with B.A. and then spent two more years in private study of geology. On 21 September 1883 he joined the Geological Survey of India as Assistant Superintendent.

In the service of the Geological Survey of India he became in 1889 Deputy Superintendent and in 1895 Superintendent, retiring in April 1917. He then went into the service of the Maharaja of Kasmir and Jammu. He was given the title of Superintendent, Mineral Survey of Jammu and Kashmir State, and held this position from 1917 to 1930. He returned to the UK in 1930 and settled at Crowborough. He died in hospital in the nearby city of Tunbridge Wells.

In Nainital on 6 June 1887 he married Martha Frances Wheeler, whose father was Major-General Frederick Wheeler.

Awards and honours
1900 — Fellow of the Geological Society of London
1914 — Lyell Medal
1916 — C.I.E.
1921 — Fellow of the Royal Society

Selected publications

References

1859 births
1945 deaths
Alumni of St John's College, Cambridge
British geologists
Fellows of the Royal Society
People educated at Caistor Grammar School
People from Kingston upon Hull
Lyell Medal winners